Gortnahoe, also known as Gortnahoo, is a village in County Tipperary, Ireland. Gortnahoe, pronounced "Gurt/na/hoo" by the locals, is part of the parish of Gortnahoe–Glengoole.

Etymology 
The former Irish name for Gortnahoe was Gort na hUaighe, meaning the ploughed field of the grave. This would seem to be a more accurate name than Gort na hUamha (the ploughed field of the cave). There is no evidence of a cave in Gortnahoe, and it is likely that the name came from the existence of a grave. Although it is uncertain, it is believed that this grave was uncovered during renovations of the Sacred Heart Church during the early 1900s, when two skeletal remains were recovered believed to belong to those who died at a battle in nearby Ballysloe between the Kings of Munster and Leinster.

History 

The village of New Birmingham lies between Gortnahoe and Glengoole.

In the townlands of New Park and Bawnleigh, there is Palatine Street, named after the Palatinate region in Germany. In the 18th century, Sir William Barker, the landlord in Kilcooley, offered protection and property to families who left the Palatine. The Griffith Valuations of 1850 has record of a Methodist chapel and a Baptist chapel in that area. Descendants of those families still farm those areas and remain members of the Church of Ireland parish.

Not far from Palatine Street is the Wellington Monument, with the inscription "Erected in August 1817 in the eightieth year of his age by Sir William Barker, in honour of his grace the Duke of Wellington and of his glorious victory over the French at Waterloo on the 15th June 1815."

With the decline of the Celtic monasteries and the arrival of the Cistercians in Ireland in the 12th century, the Cistercian monastery of Kilcooley was established by the monks from Jerpoint Abbey in 1184. The monastery continued to prosper until the disestablishment of the monasteries by King Henry VIII in 1539. During this time there were also the church centres of Buolick and Fennor. All the townlands were divided between those three parishes.

The stonework at the ruins of Kilcooley Abbey was undertaken mainly by the O'Tunneys, including the tomb of Pierce Butler of Lismolin (who was descended from John Butler of Clonamicklon) and a number of other headstones. The carved slabs of the crucifixion, the abbot, St. Christopher and the mermaid are examples of their work. The church that was at Ballinalackin in Glengoole was an outchurch from Kilcooley.

Fennor, like Kilcooley and Buolick is mentioned in the Papal Taxation lists of 1291. The church is dedicated to the nativity of the Blessed Virgin Mary. When Archbishop James Butler visited the parish in 1752, the church at Fennor does not appear to have been in use. The ruins in Fennor cemetery include the ruins of the Church of Ireland church and the ruins of the Catholic church and the residence of the priests together.

In Buolick townland are the remains of a motte, a tower house and a medieval church. Buolick was a parish as far back as 1291. The church in Buolick also has a protective tower. When a grave was being dug underneath the tower at the end of the 19th century, two bells were found underground. Those bells were given to Archbishop Croke and at the time of the restoration of Holycross Abbey they were hung in the tower of the abbey.

During the 18th century the Penal Laws made it difficult for Catholics to practice their religion and priests were scarce throughout Ireland. The outcome was that in 1743 the parishes of Kilcooley, Buolick and Fennor were amalgamated with Urlingford and Graine. The amalgamation continued until Fr. Michael Meighan became P.P. of Gortanhoe and Glengoole in 1805. It was Fr. Michael Meighan who built a new church in Glengoole in 1815. This was replaced on the same site by the present church which was built in 1976. The present church in Gortnahoe was also built by Fr Michael Meighan in 1820. This church underwent renovations in 1923, 1974–75 and in 2008. During the renovation in 1923, two skeletal remains were found when the original foundations of the church were dug up. These were believed to belong to those who died in a battle in nearby Ballysloe between the Kings of Leinster and Munster. These remains were reburied nearby.

At the time of Catholic Emancipation in 1829, the government launched a major enquiry into the provision of education and in that report it is stated that there were twelve schools in the parish, organised and funded in different ways. Nine of them were Roman Catholic schools and three were Protestant schools. It was in 1831 that the Board of National Education was established. Since 1829 there have been several amalgamations, leaving three schools in the parish at Gortnahoe, Ballysloe and Glengoole.

Places of interest 

Gortnahoe is located along the Kilkenny-Cashel Scenic Drive and is within the 'Ireland's Ancient East' tourist region.

Buolick tower house, church and cemetery

Evidence of ancient settlement in the area include multiple ring forts, a ringwork and bailey structure and medieval church and graveyard. The latter, in Buolick townland, lies immediately west of a 15th-century castle or tower house. The castle's interior is relatively intact with stairs, murder hole and garderobe structure. The ruined medieval church and graveyard which contains a number of medieval tombstones. During archaeological digs, two large bells were uncovered on the site, these where displayed outside the Archbishop's Palace in Thurles beside the Cathedral of the Assumption, until the restoration of Holy Cross Abbey, where they were rehung and remain to this day.

Kilcooley

Kilcooley, located within walking distance of the village, consists of one of Ireland's largest country estates. It is the ancestral home of the Ponsonby-Barker family, and remained in their ownership until the estate was sold in 2008. Upon the grounds sits a Cistercian abbey known as Kilcooley Abbey which dates from 1182. The church has two large carved windows on its east and west side, and its chancel contains two stone tombs and a stone altar. One of these tombs is that of the knight Piers Fitz Oge Butler. His tomb records his death as taking place in 1526 and has some carvings of ten apostles on the side of it carved by Rory O'Tunney. The sacristy is entered through a carved archway that has several carvings, including a scene depicting the crucifixion and a mermaid holding a mirror, which was meant to depict vanity. Although the private manor house and most the lands are now private property, the abbey remains open to the public.

Crag Walk
The Crag walk is in the nearby townland of Grange. This 6 km loop follows minor road, forestry tracks and woodland trails which ascend to a height from which there are views of Kilcooly Abbey, the hills to the east and the bog to the west. The village of Grange is based around the medieval tower-house castle that protected the area for the abbey estate.

People
 Shane Long, international footballer, is from Gortnahoe.

See also
 List of towns and villages in Ireland
 Gortnahoe–Glengoole GAA

References

Towns and villages in County Tipperary